"We Will Follow You Only" is a North Korean propaganda hymn dedicated to the country's leader Kim Jong-un. The song was first released on the Korean Central Television, right after Jang Sung-taek was arrested on December 9, 2013. People in factories and schools were required to sing the song, sometimes on camera.

See also

 Music of North Korea
 North Korea's cult of personality
 Lyrics

References

North Korean propaganda songs
Propaganda songs
Propaganda in North Korea
Songs about Kim Jong-un
2013 songs
Song articles with missing songwriters